Glacier Pikes is a lava dome, located in the Garibaldi Lake volcanic field, British Columbia, Canada. The dome has two rocky points at the southern end of the Sentinel Glacier Neve. It is located within Garibaldi Provincial Park and is part of the Garibaldi Ranges of the Coast Mountains. The mountain's toponym was officially adopted on May 3, 1951, by the Geographical Names Board of Canada.

Climate

Based on the Köppen climate classification, Glacier Pikes is located in the marine west coast climate zone of western North America. Most weather fronts originate in the Pacific Ocean, and travel east toward the Coast Mountains where they are forced upward by the range (Orographic lift), causing them to drop their moisture in the form of rain or snowfall. As a result, the Coast Mountains experience high precipitation, especially during the winter months in the form of snowfall. Winter temperatures can drop below −20 °C with wind chill factors below −30 °C.

See also
List of volcanoes in Canada
Volcanism of Canada
Volcanism of Western Canada

References

External links
 
  at the Canadian Mountain Encyclopedia 

Two-thousanders of British Columbia
Volcanoes of British Columbia
Subduction volcanoes

Pleistocene lava domes
Garibaldi Lake volcanic field
Garibaldi Ranges
Sea-to-Sky Corridor
New Westminster Land District
Coast Mountains